The 2013 Boels Ladies Tour also known as the 2013 Holland Ladies Tour is the 16th edition of the Holland Ladies Tour, a women's cycle stage race in the Netherlands. The tour will be held from 3 September to 8 September, 2013. The tour has an UCI rating of 2.1.

The second stage of the tour is a team time trial and is the last team time trial of the 2013 season before the World Championships team time trial in Italy on 22 September.

Teams
18 teams of 6 riders take part.
UCI teams

Orica–AIS
Hitec Products UCK
Team TIBCO–To The Top
Sengers Ladies Cycling Team
Team Argos–Shimano
MCipollini–Giordana
Boels–Dolmans Cycling Team

Other teams

Parkhotel Valkenburg Cycling Team
Team Futurumshop.nl
Water, Land en Dijken
Ronald Mc Donald huis Groningen
Restore Cycling
Rabo Plieger van Arckel
People's Trust Ladies Cycling

National teams

Italy national team
Belgium national team

Stages

Stage 1
03-09-2013 – Roden to Roden,

Stage 2
04-09-2013 – Coevorden to Coevorden,  Team time trial (TTT)

Stage 3
05-09-2013 – Leerdam to Leerdam,

Stage 4
06-09-2013 – Papendrecht to Papendrecht,

Stage 5

07-09-2013 – Zaltbommel to Veen,

Stage 6
08-09-2013 – Bunde to Berg en Terblijt,

Classification leadership

Source

Classification standings

General Classification

Source

Points Classification

Source

Sprint Classification

Source

Young rider classification

Source

Combination Classification

Source

References

External links

 
 Official Tour Guide 
 Results at the UCI website

Boels Rental Ladies Tour
Boels Rental Ladies Tour
Holland Ladies Tour
Cycling in Drenthe
Cycling in Utrecht (province)
Cycling in Altena, North Brabant
Cycling in Meerssen
Cycling in Noordenveld
Cycling in Papendrecht
Cycling in Valkenburg aan de Geul
Cycling in Zaltbommel
Sport in Coevorden
Sport in Vijfheerenlanden